Vanzolini's worm lizard (Amphisbaena vanzolinii) is a species of amphisbaenian in the family Amphisbaenidae. The species is native to northern South America.

Etymology
The specific name, vanzolinii, is in honor of Brazilian herpetologist Paulo Vanzolini.

Geographic range
A. vanzolinii is found in northern Brazil, Guyana (formerly British Guiana), and Suriname.

Habitat
The preferred natural habitat of A. vanzolinii is forest.

Reproduction
A. vanzolinii is oviparous.

See also
List of reptiles of Brazil

References

Further reading
Gans C (1963). "Notes on Amphisbaenids (Amphisbaenia, Reptilia). 8. A Redescription of Amphisbaena stejnegeri and the Description of a New Species of Amphisbaena from British Guiana". American Museum Novitates (2128): 1-18. ("Amphisbaena vanzolinii, new species", pp. 13–17, Figures 10-14).
Gans C (2005). "Checklist and Bibliography of the Amphisbaenia of the World". Bulletin of the American Museum of Natural History (289): 1–130. (Amphisbaena vanzolinii, p. 20).
Hoogmoed MS, Mott T (2003). "On the identity of Amphisbaena hugoi Vanzolini, 1990 (Reptilia: Squamata: Amphisbaenidae)". Zoologische Mededelingen 77: 455–458.
Vanzolini PE (1989). "A new species of Amphisbaena from the State of Amazonas, Brasil (Reptilia, Amphisbaenia, Amphisbaenidae)". Memórias do Instituto Oswaldo Cruz 84 (Supplement 4): 525–528. (Amphisbaena hugoi, new species).

vanzolinii
Reptiles of Brazil
Reptiles of Guyana
Reptiles of Suriname
Reptiles described in 1963
Taxa named by Carl Gans
Taxobox binomials not recognized by IUCN